Thalassocyon wareni is a species of sea snail, a marine gastropod mollusk in the family Thalassocyonidae.

Description
The length of the shell attains 24.4 mm.

Distribution
This species occurs in the Indian Ocean Abyssal Province and off the Saint Paul Island in the French Southern and Antarctic Lands.

References

 Riedel F. (2000) Ursprung und Evolution der höheren Caenogastropoda. Berliner geowissenschaftliche Abhandlungen, E 32: 1-240, 21 pl.
 Verhaeghe, M. & Poppe, G.T. (2000) A Conchological Iconography 3: The family Ficidae. Hackenheim: Conchbooks

Thalassocyonidae
Gastropods described in 2000